Henri Philippe Moïse Monteux (born Paris, 23 February 1874, died Sachsenhausen, 12 April 1943) was a French theatre and film actor, and an elder brother of the conductor Pierre Monteux.  His family was descended from Sephardic Jews who settled in France.

Life and career 
Born at 16 rue de la Grange Batelière, he was the fourth child of Gustave and Clémence Monteux who had moved to Paris from Marseille in 1864. It was a modest household, his father being a shoe-maker and his mother a piano teacher. His younger brother Pierre later recalled as children spending afternoons observing the passers-by in the local square laid the foundations of the future actor's characterisations.

Monteux made his debut at the Théâtre National de l'Odéon on 30 September 1895 as Georges Bréval in La Vie by Adolphe Thalasso, having won the prize for tragedy at the Paris Conservatoire (pupil of Gustave Worms) with his performance as Othello the previous July. He played the same part to considerable praise in a production of de Vigny's More de Venise at the same theatre in December that year. He played in the revue at the Folies Bergère in 1903: a most amusing pantomime with dogs "une pantomime extrêmement amusante, jouée par des chiens" The Merian Dogs.

He followed these with leading roles such as Molière in Le Prêcheur converti, the title rôle in Britannicus, Oreste in Andromaque, and Robert Morel in the premiere of Les Irréguliers.
He later became famous at the Théâtre Sarah-Bernhardt and was considered a specialist in the plays of Rostand, noted in roles associated with Benoît-Constant Coquelin, and went on to make several films and records.

In 1937 Monteux starred in Pas de ça chez nous at the Théâtre de la Renaissance (Théâtre du Peuple) as the President. A reviewer commented that Henri Monteux reminded everyone what a remarkable actor he was, displaying dramatic intensity coupled with fantasy.

At the time of his arrest in Paris he was playing with acclaim the drunken father in Gorky's The Mother.

Films 
 Un roman parisien (1913) - directed by Adrien Caillard
 Je t'aime (1914)
 La maison du baigneur (1914) - Adrien Caillard and Georges Monca
 L'équipage (1928) - Maurice Tourneur (English : The Crew)
 Mon curé chez les riches (1938) - Jean Boyer
 Cavalcade d'amour (1939)  - Raymond Bernard
 Savage Brigade (1939) - Jean Dréville

Theatrical work 
This includes:   
 1896 : Les Perses by Aeschylus at the Théâtre national de l'Odéon
 1902 : Nos deux consciences by Paul Anthelme (Dubois)
 1905 : Les Oberlé by Edmond Haraucourt (Jean Oberlé)
 1907 : The Affair of the Poisons by Victorien Sardou at the Théâtre de la Porte Saint-Martin (Carloni)  
 1907 : Le Manteau du Roi by Jean Aicard at the Théâtre de la Porte Saint-Martin 
 1908 : La Femme X... by Alexandre Bisson (Raymond)
 1909 : Nick Carter by Alexandre Bisson (title role)
 1909 : La Pierre de Lune by Louis Péricaud and Henri Desfontaines at the Théâtre de la Porte Saint-Martin (Franklin Blake)
 1911 : Les Deux Orphelines by d'Ennery and Cormon at the Théâtre de l'Ambigu-Comique (Pierre)
 1921 : Monsieur de Pourceaugnac by Molière
 1925 : Mon curé chez les riches by André de Lorde and Pierre Chaine (Mgr Sibué)
 1925 : L'Archange by Maurice Rostand (Général d'Espernon)  
 1926 : Deburau by Sacha Guitry (a doctor)
 1927 : Les Amants de Paris by Pierre Frondaie  (Poirinet)  
 1929 : Tristan et Iseut by Joseph Bédier and Louis Artus (Didas de Lidan)
 1931 : La Dame aux camélias by Alexandre Dumas (Georges Duval)
 1931 : L'Aiglon by Edmond Rostand at the Théâtre Sarah-Bernhardt
 1932 : Une jeune fille espagnole by Maurice Rostand (the general)
 1938 : Là-bas by Titaÿna with music by Jacqueline Batell (Fortune)
 1938 : Font-aux-Cabres by Lope de Vega, adapted by Jean Cassou and Jean Camp (the Alcade)

Notes and references
Notes

References

1874 births
1943 deaths
Male actors from Paris
French male film actors
French male silent film actors
20th-century French male actors
Conservatoire de Paris alumni
People who died in Sachsenhausen concentration camp
Sephardi Jews who died in the Holocaust
Jewish French male actors
French Jews who died in the Holocaust